Lee Lee-zen (born 6 January 1974) is a Taiwanese actor, television host and singer. He began his career in 1996 as a singer, and went on to make his acting debut in the television series Chrysalis  (1999). Since then, he has starred in television series such as The Unforgettable Memory, I Shall Succeed, Hero Daddy and Once Upon a Time in Beitou. Lee is also noted for his role in the period drama series Home, for which he won a Golden Bell Award in 2013.

Personal life
Lee's wife is television host and singer Matilda Tao. They married in 2005 and have two children together.

Filmography

Film

Television

Variety show

Music video

Discography

Studio albums

Singles

Awards and nominations

References

External links
 
 
 

1974 births
Living people
Taiwanese male television actors
Taiwanese male film actors
21st-century Taiwanese male actors
20th-century Taiwanese male actors
20th-century Taiwanese  male singers
Taiwanese television presenters
Male actors from Taipei
21st-century Taiwanese  male singers